In mathematics contraction theorem may refer to:
 The Banach contraction mapping theorem in functional analysis
 Castelnuovo's contraction theorem in algebraic geometry